National Route 362 is a national highway of Japan connecting Toyokawa, Aichi and Aoi-ku, Shizuoka in Japan, with a total length of 157.2 km (97.68 mi).

References

National highways in Japan
Roads in Aichi Prefecture
Roads in Shizuoka Prefecture